Ian James Chivers (born 5 November 1964, in Southampton, Hampshire) is a retired English cricketer. Chivers was a right-handed batsman who bowled right-arm off break.

Chivers represented Hampshire in two first-class matches between 1985 and 1987. He made his debut against Oxford University. Chivers final first-class match came against Glamorgan in 1987. In his two first-class matches he scored twenty runs and took two wickets.

He left Hampshire at the end of the 1987 County Championship.

External links
Ian Chivers at Cricinfo
Ian Chivers at CricketArchive

1964 births
Living people
Cricketers from Southampton
English cricketers
Hampshire cricketers